José Omar Verdún (12 April 1945 – 12 July 2018) was an Uruguayan professional footballer who played for Peñarol, Club Olimpia, Independiente Medellín, Atlético Bucaramanga, Real Cartagena and Cúcuta Deportivo.

He was the top scorer of the Colombian top division in the 1962 and 1963 seasons.

References

1945 births
2018 deaths
Uruguayan footballers
Peñarol players
Club Olimpia footballers
Independiente Medellín footballers
Atlético Bucaramanga footballers
Real Cartagena footballers
Cúcuta Deportivo footballers
Categoría Primera A players
Footballers from Montevideo
Uruguayan expatriate footballers
Uruguayan expatriate sportspeople in Paraguay
Expatriate footballers in Paraguay
Uruguayan expatriate sportspeople in Colombia
Expatriate footballers in Colombia
Association football forwards